Archibald Menzies (15 March 1754 – 15 February 1842) was a Scottish surgeon, botanist and naturalist. He spent many years at sea, serving with the Royal Navy, private merchants, and the Vancouver Expedition. He was the first recorded European to reach the summit of the Hawaiian volcano Mauna Loa and introduced the Monkey Puzzle tree to England.

Life and career 
Menzies was born at Easter Stix (or Styx) in the parish of Weem, in Perthshire, Scotland. While working with his elder brother William at the Royal Botanic Gardens, he drew the attention of Dr John Hope, professor of botany at Edinburgh University, who encouraged him to study medicine there. Present at Battle of the Saintes (12 April 1782), in peacetime Menzies served on Halifax Station in Nova Scotia.

In 1786 Menzies was appointed surgeon on board the Prince of Wales (Captain James Colnett), on a fur-trading voyage round Cape Horn to the northern Pacific. This ship, in company of Princess Royal (Captain Duncan), visited North America, China, and Hawaii (the Sandwich Isles) several times; Menzies collected a number of new plants on this voyage, and also ensured that none of the crew died of illness. Menzies returned to Great Britain in 1789. He was elected a fellow of the Linnean Society in 1790.

From 1791 until 1795, Menzies was appointed as naturalist to accompany Captain George Vancouver on his voyage around the world on HMS Discovery. When the surgeon fell ill, Menzies took over his duties. He collected many specimens of plants and animals during the voyage, returning them to the UK. He also made a detailed record of the voyage.

In 1794, while Discovery spent one of three winters in Hawaii, Menzies, with Lieutenant Joseph Baker and two other men, made the first recorded ascent to Mokuaweoweo, the summit of Mauna Loa.

It would be forty years before another European, fellow Scotsman David Douglas, would reach the summit on 29 January 1834.

In 1795, Menzies was served the seeds of the Chile Pine, Araucaria araucana, as a dessert while dining with the Viceroy of Chile. He was able to pop some seeds into his pocket and grow them on board ship on the way back to Europe, and returned to England with five healthy plants, the first seen in Britain. Known as the Monkey Puzzle tree, the Chile Pine became a favourite in most formal gardens of the nineteenth century.

After the voyage, Menzies served with the Navy in the West Indies. He received the degree of M.D. at the University of Aberdeen in 1799. After retiring from the Navy he became a doctor and surgeon at Notting Hill, London. He became the father of the Linnean Society upon the death of Aylmer Bourke Lambert.

Menzies's wife died in 1836. They had no children. Menzies himself died in London on 15 February 1842 and is buried in Kensal Green cemetery.

Legacy 
Menzies' name is commemorated in the scientific names of several of the plants he discovered, including Menziesia, a genus of shrubs in the Ericaceae, and the Douglas fir Pseudotsuga menziesii, the most commercially important tree in western North America. The Pacific madrone, an evergreen tree and largest of the Ericaceae, was named Arbutus menziesii in his honour by Friedrich Pursh.

Also named for Menzies, in a corrupted form as adapted by the Nuxalk people of the Bella Coola area of the Central Coast of British Columbia, is "Bensins Island", as recorded by Alexander Mackenzie during his visit there shortly after Vancouver's ship visited the area.

The Ainapo Trail he used to climb Mauna Loa is also known as "Menzies Trail". One of the principal streets surrounding the Legislative Assembly of British Columbia in Victoria, British Columbia is named Menzies Street.

Many of the specimens collected by Menzies are planted in London's Kew Gardens. He also brought back to London 112 separate collections of artefacts, which are housed at the British Museum. A comprehensive catalogue of these collections was not published until 1951.

See also
 European and American voyages of scientific exploration

References

Further reading 
  
 
 
 
Captain Vancouver, Northwest Navigator, E.C. Coleman.  Tempus Publishing 2006.

External links 

Archibald Menzies (1754 - 1842) on www.victorialodging.com

1754 births
1842 deaths
Alumni of the University of Edinburgh
Botanists active in the Pacific
Botanists active in North America
Botanists with author abbreviations
Bryologists
People from Perth and Kinross
British pteridologists
Royal Navy officers
Scottish botanists
Scottish explorers
Scottish sailors
Scottish surgeons
Scottish naturalists